Swimming at the 1968 Summer Paralympics consisted of 68 events, 34 for men and 34 for women.

Medal summary

Medal table

Participating nations

Men's events

Women's events

References 

 

1968 Summer Paralympics events
1968
Paralympics